A spotter is someone trained to look for something.

Spotter may refer to:

Sports
 Spotter (auto racing), a type of navigator in auto racing
 Spotter (weight training), someone who assists someone lifting a weight in order to prevent injuries
 Spotting (climbing), a person who stands below a climber for accident prevention

Military or policing
 Spotter (sniping), member of a sniper team who assists in observation of targets and handles ancillary tasks
 Spotter plane, an aircraft used for surveillance
 Artillery observer or spotter, a person who is responsible for directing artillery and mortar fire
 Informant, a person who provides privileged information about a person or organization to an agency

Other uses
 Spotter (maneuvering), an individual who helps guide a vehicle
 Weather spotter, an individual who observes the weather to inform media or others
 Storm spotter, a weather spotter who observes severe weather events
 Aircraft spotter, a hobbyist who tracks and records the movement of aircraft
 Bus spotter, a hobbyist who seeks to see all buses in a particular fleet or produced by a particular manufacturer
 Ship Spotter, a hobbyist who observes and tracks Ships
 Satellite spotter, a hobbyist who observes and tracks artificial satellites that are orbiting Earth
 A local writer for Spotted by Locals travel guides
 Various dolphin species of the genus Stenella
 Shark spotter, someone who engages in shark surveillance for shark attack prevention
 An American term for a banksman

See also
 Spot (disambiguation)
 Forward air control, the provision of guidance to military close air support aircraft
 Wildlife observation, noting the occurrence or abundance of animal species for research or recreation
 Trainspotter, a person interested, recreationally, in rail transport
 Ship watching, observing the passage of various ships